The 1999 Great Yarmouth Borough Council election took place on 6 May 1999 to elect members of Great Yarmouth Borough Council in Norfolk, England. One third of the council was up for election and the Labour Party stayed in overall control of the council.

After the election, the composition of the council was:
Labour 29
Conservative 19

Election result

References

1999 English local elections
1999
20th century in Norfolk